Tifinagh (Tuareg Berber language:) is a script used to write the Berber languages.  Tifinagh is descended from the ancient Libyco-Berber alphabet.  The traditional Tifinagh, sometimes called Tuareg Tifinagh, is still favored by the Tuareg Berbers of the Sahara desert in southern Algeria, northeastern Mali, northern Niger and northern Burkina Faso for use writing the Tuareg Berber language. Neo-Tifinagh is an alphabet developed by Berber Academy to adopt Tuareg Tifinagh for use with Kabyle; it has been since modified for use across North Africa. 

Tifinagh is one of three major competing Berber orthographies alongside the Berber Latin alphabet and the Arabic script. Tifinagh is the official script for Tamazight, an official language of Morocco and Algeria. However, outside of symbolic cultural uses, Latin remains the dominant script for writing Berber languages throughout North Africa.

The ancient Libyco-Berber script (or the Libyc script) was used by the ancient northern Berbers known as Libyco-Berbers, also known as Libyc people, Numidians, Afri and Mauretanians, who inhabited the northern parts of Morocco, Algeria, Tunisia and Libya as well as the Canary Islands west of Morocco. 

Etymology
The word tifinagh (singular tafinəq < *ta-finəɣ-t) is thought by some scholars to be a Berberized feminine plural cognate or adaptation of the Latin word "Punicus", (meaning "Punic" or "Phoenician") through the Berber feminine prefix ti- and the root √FNƔ < *√PNQ < Latin Punicus; thus tifinagh could possibly mean "the Phoenician (letters)" or "the Punic letters". Others support an etymology involving the Tuareg verb efnegh, meaning to write. However, the Tuareg verb efnegh is probably derived from the noun "Tifinagh" because all the northern Berbers of Morocco, northern Algeria, Tunisia and northern Libya have a different (and probably older) verb "ari, aru, ara" which means "to write".

Libyco-Berber

Before or during the existence of the ancient Berber kingdoms of Numidia (northern Algeria) and Mauretania (northern Morocco) many inscriptions were engraved using the Libyco-Berber script, also known as Ancient Libyan or the Libyc script.  The Libyco-Berber script is found in thousands of stone inscriptions and engravings throughout Morocco, northern Algeria, Tunisia, northern Libya and the Canary Islands. 

The exact evolution of both Libyco-Berber and Tifinagh is still unclear. The latter writing system was widely used in antiquity by speakers of the largely undeciphered Numidian language, also called Old Libyan, throughout Africa and on the Canary Islands. The script's origin is uncertain, with some scholars suggesting it is related to, descended or developed from the Phoenician alphabet while others argue an independent conception with slight Phoenician influences. Its first appearance is also uncertain, but it is no older than the first millennium BCE, with the oldest remains likely originating from the 6th century BCE. It disappeared in the northernmost areas of North Africa during the 8th century, after the Arab conquest of the Maghreb, Lybico-Berber along with Latin being replaced by the Arabic script.

The Libyco-Berber script was a pure abjad; it had no vowels. Gemination was not marked. The writing was usually from the bottom to the top, although right-to-left, and even other orders, were also found. The letters took different forms when written vertically than when they were written horizontally.

Tuareg Tifinagh

The ancient Libyco-Berber script branched into the Tuareg Tifinagh script which is used to this day to write the Berber Tuareg languages, which belong to the Berber branch of the Afroasiatic family. Early uses of the script have been found on rock art and in various sepulchres. Among these are the 1,500 year old monumental tomb of the Tuareg matriarch Tin Hinan, where vestiges of a Tifinagh inscription have been found on one of its walls.

According to M.C.A. MacDonald, the Tuareg are "an entirely oral society in which memory and oral communication perform all the functions which reading and writing have in a literate society ... The Tifinagh are used primarily for games and puzzles, short graffiti and brief messages."

Occasionally, the script has been used to write other neighbouring languages such as Tagdal, which belongs to a separate Songhay family.

Orthography
Common forms of the letters are illustrated at left, including various ligatures of t and n. Gemination, though phonemic, is not indicated in Tifinagh. The letter t, +, is often combined with a preceding letter to form a ligature. Most of the letters have more than one common form, including mirror-images of the forms shown here.

When the letters l and n are adjacent to themselves or to each other, the second is offset, either by inclining, lowering, raising, or shortening it.  For example, since the letter l is a double line, ||, and n a single line, |, the sequence nn may be written |/ to differentiate it from l.  Similarly, ln is ||/, nl |//, ll ||//, nnn |/|, etc.

Traditionally, the Tifinagh script does not indicate vowels except word-finally, where a single dot stands for any vowel. In some areas, Arabic vowel diacritics are combined with Tifinagh letters to transcribe vowels, or y, w may be used for long ī and ū.

Neo-Tifinagh

Development 

Neo-Tifinagh is the modern fully alphabetic script developed by Berber Academy, a cultural association formed by members of the Kabylian diaspora in Paris. The script was developed by modifying Tuareg Tifinagh to accommodate Kabyle phonetics. Neo-Tifinagh was spread by Berber Academy's active promotion of the script, including its usage in their bulletin, Imazighen, which was widely read by Berber communities in Algeria and Morocco. 

Neo-Tifinagh has since undergone further reform and is used in various contexts throughout North Africa. The Royal Institute of Amazigh Culture has standardized Neo-Tifinagh for use as the official orthography of Standard Moroccan Amazigh, an official language of Morocco.

Political History 
The creation and promotion of Neo-Tifinagh by Berber Academy was part of its efforts in spreading Berberism throughout the 1960s and 1970s. The use of Neo-Tifinagh in their publications was influential in raising Berber consciousness; one reader has described its effect as being "the proof that we actually existed."

The Moroccan state arrested and imprisoned people using Neo-Tifinagh during the 1980s and 1990s. The Algerian Black Spring was also partly caused by this repression of Berber language.

In the 1980s, the Berber flag, which was designed in 1970 and uses the Tifinagh letter z (Tifinagh: ⵣ) from the root of Amazigh, began being used in demonstrations. The flag was adopted by the World Amazigh Congress in 1997.

In Morocco, following the creation of Standard Moroccan Amazigh in 2001, the 2003 adoption of Neo-Tifinagh served as a way to compromise between the deeply split proponents of the Latin script versus the Arabic script as Amazigh's official orthography. This choice, however, has also resulted in backlash from many Amazigh activists, who find Tifinagh to be limiting when compared to the Latin script. 

In Libya, the government of Muammar Gaddafi consistently banned Tifinagh from being used in public contexts such as store displays and banners. After the Libyan Civil War, the National Transitional Council has shown an openness towards the Berber language. The rebel Libya TV, based in Qatar, has included the Berber language and the Neo-Tifinagh alphabet in some of its programming.

Tifinagh continues to be used as "an emblem of distinctive Berber identity and nationhood."

Modern Use 
Due to the official adoption of Neo-Tifinagh in Morocco in 2003, the script has been adapted by the Royal Institute of Amazigh Culture for modern digital use. Government websites in Morocco may be displayed in Neo-Tifinagh.

Starting in 2003, Neo-Tifinagh was used for a small duration of Moroccan elementary school to teach Standard Moroccan Amazigh. However, practical use of Tifinagh in Morocco remains rare; one Amazigh activist has summarized the situation with the anecdote that he "[knows] that some books that were written in Tifinagh were read by only two people ... the one who wrote the book and the one who did the editing!" Public displays of Tifinagh in Morocco remains restricted primarily to signage and other culturally conspicuous uses.

Despite Neo-Tifinagh's Algerian origins through Berber Academy, the Latin alphabet became the predominant script used amongst Kabylians. Debate in what script to use for Kabylian tends to view the Latin and Arabic scripts as the primary options.

As of 2012, Tifinaght is "not widely used in education or the media in any country."

Letters

The following are the letters and a few ligatures of traditional Tuareg Tifinagh and Neo-Tifinagh:

Unicode

Tifinagh was added to the Unicode Standard in March 2005, with the release of version 4.1.

The Unicode block range for Tifinagh is U+2D30–U+2D7F:

References

Bibliography
Aghali-Zakara, Mohamed (1994). Graphèmes berbères et dilemme de diffusion: Interaction des alphabets , ajami et tifinagh. Etudes et Documents Berbères 11, 107-121.
Aghali-Zakara, Mohamed; and Drouin, Jeanine (1977). Recherches sur les Tifinaghs- Eléments graphiques et sociolinguistiques. Comptes-rendus du Groupe Linguistique des Etudes Chamito-Sémitiques (GLECS).
Ameur, Meftaha (1994). Diversité des transcriptions : pour une notation usuelle et normalisée de la langue berbère. Etudes et Documents Berbères 11, 25–28.
Boukous, Ahmed (1997). Situation sociolinguistique de l’Amazigh. International Journal of the Sociology of Language 123, 41–60.
Chaker, Salem (1994). Pour une notation usuelle à base Tifinagh. Etudes et Documents Berbères 11, 31–42.
Chaker, Salem (1996). Propositions pour la notation usuelle à base  du berbère. Etudes et Documents Berbères 14, 239–253.
Chaker, Salem (1997). La Kabylie: un processus de développement linguistique autonome. International Journal of the Sociology of Language 123, 81–99.
Durand, O. (1994). Promotion du berbère : problèmes de standardisation et d’orthographe. Expériences européennes. Etudes et Documents Berbères 11, 7–11.

Savage, Andrew. 2008. Writing Tuareg – the three script options. International Journal of the Sociology of Language 192: 5–14

 Encyclopaedia of Islam, s.v. Tifinagh.

External links

lbi-project.org, a database of Libyco-Berber inscriptions with images and information
Academic papers on the Libyco-Berber inscriptions
ancientscripts.com – Berber, a fact file on Tifinagh and a legend of characters
Tifinagh Font for Windows

Alphabets
Tuareg
Writing systems of Africa
Berberism
Libyco-Berber